Massot is a surname of the following people
Bruno Massot (born 1989), French-born figure skater
Firmin Massot (1766–1849), Swiss portrait painter
Francois de Massot, political activist, writer and journalist
Joe Massot (1933–2002), writer and film director
Michel Massot (born 1960), Belgian jazz musician
Pepe Massot (born 1995), Spanish racing driver
William Massot (born 1977), French association football player